Only Sometimes is the first EP from the San Francisco-based dream pop group Astral, released in 2002.  The EP was self-produced and the first recording that the band released.  The EP charted on some college radio stations.  It is considered indicative of the direction that the group would take with their first album, Orchids, which was released a year later.  The song "Catalyst" was improvised.  The song "Turn Me Around" would later appear on Orchids.  Some of the recordings that eventually appeared on Orchids were originally recorded during the sessions for Only Sometimes.

Track listing
Turn Me Around
When Its Over
Hold My Breath
In the Sky
Catalyst (live)

Notes

2002 EPs
Astral (band) albums